S.A.B. Intersection is formed by the intersection of Charoen Krung and Worachak with Chakkrawat roads in Bangkok's Pom Prap Sattru Phai and Samphanthawong Districts near Khlong Thom area, regarded as an end of Worachak road and beginning of Chakkrawat road.  

It was originally called Worachak Intersection after the road, but became known as S.A.B. after the Belgian import company Société Anonyme Belge which established its office and store on the northern corner in 1912. The building now hosts the offices of Sing Sian Yer Pao newspaper.

Opposite the S.A.B. Building on the junction's eastern corner is the near-identical S.E.C. Building, also originally a leading department store. It is now the site of the Chaloem Nakhon Branch of Siam Commercial Bank. Both buildings are registered ancient monuments, and the Siam Commercial Bank building received the ASA Architectural Conservation Award in 2007.

References

Road junctions in Bangkok
Pom Prap Sattru Phai district

Samphanthawong district